Cessapalombo is a comune (municipality) in the Province of Macerata in the Italian region Marche, located about  southwest of Ancona and about  southwest of Macerata.

Among the churches in the town are:
Santa Maria in Insula
San Giovanni Battista
Abbazia San Salvatore

References

Cities and towns in the Marche